Jaten Dimsdale, known by his stage name Teddy Swims, is an American singer-songwriter, known for blending genres including R&B, soul, country, and pop. Originally attracting fans through his cover performances on his YouTube, which has amassed 400 million views as of 2022, Swims released his debut major label single in January 2020 and has since released two EPs, Unlearning and Tough Love.

Early life 

Swims spent his childhood in Conyers, Georgia. His father introduced him to soul music at an
early age by way of artists like Marvin Gaye, Stevie Wonder, and Al Green. Swims' family were football enthusiasts, and he had been playing for ten years when one of his teachers suggested signing up for a musical theater class in his second year at Salem High School. Swims
discovered his passion for performance through his high school theater experience, where he performed in a number of musicals and Shakespeare plays. He began playing instruments, including piano and ukulele, and watched YouTube videos of singers to help develop his vocal technique.

Career

2019: Early career 
Swims began his music career in a variety of Atlanta-area bands, including alternative rock band WildHeart and post-hardcore band Eris, as well as soul and hair metal cover bands. In early 2019 Swims' friend Addy Maxwell invited him to rap over some beats he had made, which earned the pair an opening slot on a US tour with Tyler Carter. On this tour he began performing under the name Teddy Swims – referring to a nickname from his childhood referencing his size, and an internet-speak acronym for "someone who isn't me sometimes," referring to the idea of integrating different parts of his personality.

In June, Swims posted his first cover performance on YouTube, Michael Jackson's "Rock With You", and continued posting additional covers of artists from a mix of genres regularly including Lewis Capaldi, Chris Stapleton, Amy Winehouse, and H.E.R. His cover of Shania Twain's "You're Still the One" posted in October went on to become his most viewed video, with 86 million views as of 2022. Swims' videos quickly accumulated millions of views, and after releasing one single "Night Off" independently in July, he signed a record deal with Warner Records in December.

2020–2021: Unlearning EP 

Swims released his debut major label single "Picky" in January 2020 and embarked on his first headline tour the same month. He released several covers in the months following, including "Blinding Lights" in May, "What's Going On" in June (from which he donated the royalties to the NAACP Legal Defense and Educational Fund), and "You're Still The One" (which he had previously posted on his YouTube) in July. Swims released his next single "Broke" in August, and released an additional version with Thomas Rhett in October.

In February 2021, Swims released his single "My Bad", which he performed on the Kelly Clarkson Show, and was named an "Artist You Need to Know" by Rolling Stone magazine. In March he released his single "Till I Change Your Mind", followed by "Bed On Fire" in April, which he performed on the Late Show with Stephen Colbert and later re-released as a collaboration with Ingrid Andress. In May, Swims released his debut seven-track EP Unlearning, followed by a tour supporting Zac Brown Band that summer.

2021–present: Tough Love EP 

In August 2021, Swims released his single "Simple Things" which he performed on the Late Late Show with James Corden in September and the Today Show in November.

After releasing his single "911", Swims released his six-track EP Tough Love in January 2022. Swims performed the EP's songs "Love for a Minute" on Late Night with Seth Meyers in January, and "911" on The Ellen DeGeneres Show in February. Swims supported the EP with a three-month headline tour through Europe and North America beginning in February, followed by a United Kingdom and mainland Europe tour in May and June.

Discography

Extended plays

Singles

As lead artist

As featured artist

References

External links 
 Official website

American male singers
American songwriters
Living people
21st-century American male singers
21st-century American singers
Musicians from Atlanta
1992 births